Riverlands is a locality in Marlborough, New Zealand. State Highway 1 runs through the settlement, and the Ōpaoa River flows past to the northeast. Blenheim is about 2.5 km to the northwest.

According to the 2013 New Zealand census, Riverlands has a population of 471, an increase of 9 people since the 2006 census. There were 231 males and 240 females.

Demographics

Riverlands had a population of 465 at the 2018 New Zealand census, an increase of 60 people (14.8%) since the 2013 census, and an increase of 75 people (19.2%) since the 2006 census. There were 150 households. There were 267 males and 198 females, giving a sex ratio of 1.35 males per female. The median age was 42.2 years (compared with 37.4 years nationally), with 93 people (20.0%) aged under 15 years, 66 (14.2%) aged 15 to 29, 234 (50.3%) aged 30 to 64, and 72 (15.5%) aged 65 or older.

Ethnicities were 84.5% European/Pākehā, 10.3% Māori, 9.7% Pacific peoples, 0.6% Asian, and 3.9% other ethnicities (totals add to more than 100% since people could identify with multiple ethnicities).

The proportion of people born overseas was 18.7%, compared with 27.1% nationally.

Although some people objected to giving their religion, 53.5% had no religion, 39.4% were Christian and 1.3% had other religions.

Of those at least 15 years old, 63 (16.9%) people had a bachelor or higher degree, and 66 (17.7%) people had no formal qualifications. The median income was $40,900, compared with $31,800 nationally. The employment status of those at least 15 was that 207 (55.6%) people were employed full-time, 78 (21.0%) were part-time, and 6 (1.6%) were unemployed.

Education
Riverlands School is a coeducational full primary (years 1-8) school with a roll of  students as of  The school celebrated its centenary in 2006.

References

Populated places in the Marlborough Region